Harpalus microthorax is a species of ground beetle in the subfamily Harpalinae. It was described by Victor Motschulsky in 1849.

References

microdemas
Beetles described in 1849